Ellen A. Gorman (born November 9, 1955) is an American attorney and judge who served as a justice of the Maine Supreme Judicial Court from 2007 to 2022.

Education

Gorman graduated from Trinity College with a Bachelor of Arts in 1977 and Cornell University Law School with a Juris Doctor in 1982.  She was admitted to the Maine Bar in 1982.

Career

Gorman worked in private practice with the Portland firm Richardson, Tyler & Troubh before being appointed by governor John R. McKernan Jr. to serve on the Maine District Court in 1989. She has also has been a member of the Maine Judicial Education Committee and the Maine Workers Compensation Commission.

After 11 years on the District Court, governor Angus King appointed Gorman to the Maine Superior Court. On October 1, 2007, governor John Baldacci appointed her to the Maine Supreme Judicial Court.  She was reappointed for a second term in 2015 by governor Paul LePage. Gorman retired on March 18, 2022, when her term ended.

Personal life
Gorman is a resident of Auburn, Maine.

References

1955 births
Living people
20th-century American lawyers
21st-century American judges
Cornell Law School alumni
Justices of the Maine Supreme Judicial Court
People from Auburn, Maine
Trinity Washington University alumni
Women in Maine politics
Maine lawyers
Maine state court judges
Superior court judges in the United States
20th-century American women lawyers
21st-century American women judges